Cape Ingrid is a dark rock promontory separating Norvegia Bay and Sandefjord Cove on the west side of Peter I Island, Antarctica. It was discovered in 1927 by a Norwegian expedition under Eyvind Tofte in the Odd I, a vessel of Lars Christensen's whaling fleet, and named for Ingrid Christensen, the wife of Lars.

References

Headlands of Antarctica
Peter I Island